The Iri station explosion was a disaster that occurred in Iri, North Jeolla, South Korea on November 11, 1977, at 9:15 p.m. About 40 tons of dynamite carried in a freight train  Gwangju exploded at Iri station.  The town and train station have both been rechristened as Iksan. At least 56 people were killed.

Damage

Deaths and injuries
The explosion killed 59 people and seriously injured 185 others; altogether, over 1,300 people were injured. At the time, the population of Iri numbered around 130,000 people.

Infrastructure and property
The force of the explosion carved a crater ten meters deep and thirty meters wide. Most structures within a 500-meter radius from the site of the explosion were severely damaged. Approximately 9,500 buildings were affected by the explosion, which left about 10,000 people without a home. Residential apartment buildings, the city's first, were constructed to accommodate the displaced.

Financial and political costs
Financial damage was extensive; property losses alone were estimated to be ₩23 billion won; the government allocated ₩13 billion won for the recovery effort.

Transportation Minister Choi Kyung-rok resigned soon thereafter.

See also

1995 Daegu gas explosions

References

Explosions in 1977
North Jeolla Province
Railway accidents and incidents in South Korea
Railway accidents in 1977
Explosions in South Korea
1977 in South Korea
Iksan